San Ponziano  is a 20th-century parochial church and titular church in the northern suburbs of Rome, dedicated to Pope Pontian (d. AD 235).

History 

San Ponziano was built in 1970–74. Pope John Paul II visited in 1982.

On 24 November 2007, it was made a titular church to be held by a cardinal-deacon. 

Cardinal-Protectors
Urbano Navarrete Cortés (2007–2010)
Santos Abril y Castelló (2012–present)

References

External links

Titular churches
Roman Catholic churches completed in 1974
20th-century Roman Catholic church buildings in Italy
Rome Q. XXVIII Monte Sacro Alto